David Stephen Forbes (born November 16, 1948) is a Canadian former professional ice hockey player. He played for the Boston Bruins and Washington Capitals of the National Hockey League between 1973 and 1978, and for the Cincinnati Stingers of the World Hockey Association between 1978 and 1979.

Playing career
Forbes played for American International College between 1967 and 1971. He signed as a free agent in 1973 with the Boston Bruins, and made his NHL debut that year. Forbes made an impact as a defensive-minded forward as he helped guide the Bruins to the finals in 1974 during his rookie season, and to the finals in 1977. Forbes played four seasons with Boston until he was claimed by the Washington Capitals in the Waiver Draft prior to the 1977–78 season. After playing one season with the Capitals, he was released after only playing two games during the 1978–79 season and signed to play for the Cincinnati Stingers of the World Hockey Association.

Criminal charges
Forbes was charged with aggravated assault in Minneapolis in 1975 after butt-ending Henry Boucha's eye socket in a game against the Minnesota North Stars, leaving Boucha with limited vision in the right eye.  The trial received much publicity as it was highly unusual for an athlete to face criminal charges for assault during a game. The trial ended with a hung jury; the charges were not refiled.  Forbes was suspended for 10 games by the NHL, and Forbes and the Bruins settled a civil case by paying Boucha in excess of one million dollars.

Career statistics

Regular season and playoffs

References

External links

1948 births
Living people
American International Yellow Jackets men's ice hockey players
Anglophone Quebec people
Binghamton Dusters players
Boston Braves (AHL) players
Boston Bruins players
Canadian ice hockey left wingers
Cincinnati Stingers players
Dayton Gems players
Ice hockey people from Montreal
Oklahoma City Blazers (1965–1977) players
Undrafted National Hockey League players
Violence in sports
Washington Capitals players